Crime in Montenegro is combated by the Montenegro Police and other agencies.

Crime by type

Murder 

In 2012, Montenegro had a murder rate of 2.7 per 100,000 population. There were a total of 17 murders in Montenegro in 2012.

Organised crime 

The Montenegrin Mafia or Montenegrin Cartel are terms used for the various criminal organizations based in Montenegro or composed of Montenegrins. There are 700 documented organized criminals operating within Montenegro; outside of the country Montenegrin gangs are active throughout Europe-notably Serbia and Slovenia. The gangs tend to specialize in cigarette smuggling, narcotics and arms trafficking.

Human trafficking 

Montenegro is a transit, source, and destination country for men, women, and girls who are subjected to trafficking in persons, specifically conditions of forced prostitution and forced labor. Trafficking victims are mostly females from Ukraine, Moldova, Serbia, Albania, and Kosovo, who migrate or are smuggled through the country en route to other destinations and subjected to conditions of forced prostitution in Montenegro. Roma children are coerced into organized street begging in the country.

Corruption 

Corruption is a serious problem in Montenegro. The European Commission finds in its Progress Report 2013 that efficiency in the fight against corruption is constrained by frequent legislative changes and the lax attitude among law enforcement authorities to investigate corruption allegations, especially those involving high-level officials.

References